The City Park Cross Country Course is a cross country course in City Park in New Orleans. The 2.00 mile/3.22 km grass loop cross country course is all flat and starts near the corner of Wisner Boulevard and Harrison Avenue.  

The course is the home course for the Xavier Gold Rush and Gold Nuggets men's and women's cross country teams.

Events
College cross country meets are held on the course. The annual Sugar Bowl Cross Country Classic uses the course for its meet. The 2014 and 2016 Gulf Coast Athletic Conference cross country championships were held at the course.

The course also hosts LHSAA cross country meets.

References

External links
New Orleans City Park website

College cross country courses in the United States
Cross country running courses in Louisiana
Xavier Gold Rush and Gold Nuggets